Cv Jaceguai (V-31)  was the second ship of the  of the Brazilian Navy.

Construction and career
The ship was built at Naval Arsenal Rio de Janeiro in Rio de Janeiro and was launched on 8 June 1987 and commissioned on 2 April 1991.

She was decommissioned on 18 September 2019.

During MISSILEX on 24 June 2021, an AM-39 Exocet anti-ship missile was launched from an AH-15B helicopter against the former Jaceguai's hull which later sank.

Gallery

References

External links

Ships built in Brazil
Inhaúma-class corvettes
1987 ships